Cowie Island is a small island in northern Saskatchewan, Canada, surrounded by Cree Lake.

References

Uninhabited islands of Saskatchewan
Lake islands of Saskatchewan